Donalda Duprey-Abadie (born 1 March 1967 in Fredericton, New Brunswick) is a Canadian retired athlete who specialised in the hurdling events. She represented her country at the 1992 Summer Olympics, as well as three outdoor and one indoor World Championships.

Competition record

Personal bests
Outdoor
100 metres hurdles – 13.09 (+1.4 m/s) (Lausanne 1994)
400 metres hurdles – 55.42 (0.0 m/s) (São Paulo 1994)
Indoor
400 metres – 54.52 (Toronto 1993)

References

External links
 
 
 
 
 
 

1967 births
Living people
Sportspeople from Fredericton
Canadian female hurdlers
Olympic track and field athletes of Canada
Athletes (track and field) at the 1992 Summer Olympics
Commonwealth Games bronze medallists for Canada
Athletes (track and field) at the 1986 Commonwealth Games
Athletes (track and field) at the 1990 Commonwealth Games
Athletes (track and field) at the 1994 Commonwealth Games
Commonwealth Games medallists in athletics
Pan American Games silver medalists for Canada
Athletes (track and field) at the 1995 Pan American Games
Pan American Games medalists in athletics (track and field)
World Athletics Championships athletes for Canada
Medalists at the 1995 Pan American Games
20th-century Canadian women
Medallists at the 1986 Commonwealth Games
Medallists at the 1994 Commonwealth Games